The Hundings (Old English: Hundingas, the "hound-clan") are a legendary tribe or clan in early Germanic sources, mostly mentioned due to their feud with the Wulfings (the "wolf-clan").

History
In the Poetic Edda, Hunding is a king of the Saxons, slain by Helgi Hundingsbane. The Gesta Danorum mentions a Danish king Helgo who slew Hundingus, king of Saxony, in single combat. The historical core of the story is likely a conflict between the Eastern Geats (the wolf-clan) and the Lombards (the hound-clan).

Hunding itself is a patronymic translating to "son of a hound", while the Hundings as a clan (sibb) would be the descendants of Hunding. Being named a "hound" or "dog" was by no means an insult in pre-Christian Germanic culture, but that the animal was rather a symbol of the warrior, while in Christian Germanic culture, it became associated with heathendom, "heathen hounds" being an appellation especially of the pagan Vikings (cf. Ulfhednar).

The name of Lamicho, king of the Lombards, may mean "little barker" (Harris 2004). 

In Paulus' Historia Langobardorum, the Lombards terrorize their neighbors by spreading the word that they had dog-headed warriors, possibly a reference to ulfhednar. In  Paulus's account, Lamicho is one of seven sons of a "prostitute" (meretrix), who is fostered by king Agelmund. This "prostitute" has been explained by Rudolf Much (followed by Höfler and others) as going back to a word for bitch.  The Lombards' original ethnic name, Winnili, has also been connected with "savage dogs" by Much.

In Eddaic account of a feud between the Hundings and the Wulfings surrounding Helgi Hundingsbane  may correspond to the  Lombard story, and Malone (1926) explains the whole story of Lamicho as the Hunding version of the same feud.  Jacob Grimm (1848)  compared the story of Lamicho to the German legends of the origins of  the Welfen, in German legend tracing their ancestry to fostered babes who were given the surname of "whelps" (Harris 2004). Hundings also appear in Sturlaugs saga starfsama, where they are a tribe of Cynocephali dwelling in Hundingjaland, which is apparently in much the same latitudes as Bjarmaland. These Hundings may relate to those Cynocephali mentioned by Adam of Bremen.

The Hundingas in Old English literature are mentioned in Beowulf, and in Widsith. The Widsith poem mentions the Hundings twice, once in a list of Germanic clans, as ruled by  Mearchalf, and a second time among outlandish tribes and peoples, in the sequence mid hæðnum ond mid hæleþum ond mid hundingum "with heathens, heroes and dog-people", implying a re-interpretation of the name as a remote people of "heathen hounds". This re-interpretation is complete in a later  Anglo-Saxon manuscript on the Marvels of the East, where the Cynocephali are glossed as healf hundingas.<ref>Tiberius, f. 80r: Eac swylce þær beoþ cende healf hundingas þa syndon hatene conopoenas. hy habbaþ horses mana & eoferes tuxas & hunda heafdu & heora oruþ byþ swylce fyreslig. þas land beoþ neah þæm burgum þe beoþ eallum world welum gefylled þis on þa suþ healfe aegiptna landes.” ("And similarly there is a race of half-dogs that are called conopoenas. They have a horse’s mane and a boar’s tusks and a dog’s head and their breath is like fire. This land is near the city which is filled with all the costly things of the world. This is in the south half of Egypt’s lands.") Asa Simon Mittman, Headless men and hungry monsters, The Sarum Seminar, Stanford University Alumni Center (2003) </ref>

See also
 Tribes of Widsith
 Wulfing
 Wuffing
 Berserker

References

 Joseph Harris, Myth and Literary History: Two Germanic Examples'', Oral Tradition 19.1 (2004) 3-19.
 Otto Höfler. "Cangrande von Verona und das Hundsymbol der Langobarden".  in: Brauch und Sinnbild: Eugen Fehrle zum 60. Geburtstag gewidmet von seinen Schülern und Freunden. ed. by Ferdinand Herrmann and Wolfgang Treutlein. Karlsruhe: Kommissionsverlag (1940) pp. 101–37.
 Rudolf Much, "Der Germanische Osten in der Heldensage." Zeitschrift für deutsches Altertum und deutsche Literatur, 57 (1920), 145-176. (archive.org)
 Rudolf Much, "Widsith. Beitrage zu einem Commentar." Zeitschrift für deutsches Altertum und deutsche Literatur, 62 (1925), 113-50.
 J. Insley, 'Hundingas', RGA XV, 240-1 

Germanic mythology
Lombard families
Characters in Beowulf
Mythological dogs